A cabeza de barangay (literally "head of [the] barangay), also known as teniente del barrio, was the leader or chief of a barangay or barrio in the Philippines during the Spanish colonial period. The post was inherited from the first datus who became cabezas de barangay when the many independent barangays became tributary vassals of the Spanish Empire. King Philip II of Spain, after whom the Philippines were named, decreed that the native nobility of the country should retain the honors and privileges they had before their conversion and subjection to the Spanish Crown.

History 
Under the form of government employed by the Kingdom of Spain, several existing neighboring barangays were combined to form a municipality and the cabezas de barangay participated in the governance of the new towns, forming part of the elite ruling class called the principalía. From among their ranks the head of the town, the gobernadorcillo or capitan municipal, were elected. Furthermore, only the members of their class could elect the gobernadorcillo.

The office of the cabeza de barangay was hereditary.  The cabecería, i.e., headship of the barangays, was a more ancient institution of native nobilities that pre-dates the Spanish conquest and was doubtless hereditary. The increase of population during the Spanish regime consequently needed the creation of further cabecerías and election of new cabezas. The emergence of the mestizo culture (both Spanish mestizos and Chinese mestizos) had also necessitated this and even the subsequent creation of separate institutions or offices of gobernadorcillos for the different mestizo groups and for the natives living in the same territories or cities with large population. When the office of the cabeza de barangay fell vacant due to the lack of an heir or the resignation of the incumbent, a substitute was appointed by the superintendent if the barangay was near the capital of the province. In distant areas, the appointment was done by the respective delegate, based on the recommendation of the gobernadorcillo and other cabezas. The cabezas, their wives, and first-born sons were exempt from the payment of tribute to the Spanish Crown.

With the change of government (from monarchy to democracy) when the Americans took over the rule of the Philippines, the post became elective and anyone could become the head of the barangay, which came to be called a "barrio". The former cabezas de barangay and the rest of the members of the principalía and their descendants lost their traditional privileges and powers, but they remained as very influential elements in the political and economic life of a new democratic society.

Under the democratic rule, the head of the smallest unit of the Filipino society was no longer called cabeza de barangay. Furthermore, the barrio captains (or capitán del barrio as these local leaders were then called), though exercising the same leadership function, no longer retained the aristocratic quality that was associated with this office during the pre-conquest and the colonial periods. Nor since the American rule has the office of the chief of the barangay been exclusive to the families belonging to the principalía, and is no longer hereditary.

From the presidency of Ferdinand Marcos onwards, the term "barangay" was re-adopted, but the Spanish title "cabeza de barangay" is not used. Instead, the term "barangay captain" in English, or punong barangay in Tagalog became the official designation to this leadership role.

See also 

 Filipino styles and honorifics
 Gobernadorcillo

Notes

References

Local politicians in the Philippines
Positions of subnational authority
Captaincy General of the Philippines
People of Spanish colonial Philippines
Filipino nobility